Ken Davies may refer to:
 Ken Davies (politician) (born 1948), Australian politician
 Ken Davies (artist) (1925–2017), American painter
 Ken Davies (ice hockey) (1922–2004), Canadian hockey player
 Ken Davies (rugby) (1916–1984), Welsh rugby union and rugby league footballer
 Ken Davies (footballer) (1923–2008), English association footballer
 Ken Davies, 1993 winner of the Welsh Sports and Saloon Car Championship

See also
 Kenneth Davis (disambiguation)